En canot sur les chemins d'eau du Roi ("By Canoe on the King's Waterways") is a 2005 travel book by the French writer Jean Raspail. It retells the North American voyage the author made by canoe in 1949, following the route of the 17th-century missionary Father Marquette.

The book received the Prix littéraire de l'armée de terre - Erwan Bergot and the Prix du Salon nautique – Le Point.

Synopsis
In 1949, Jean Raspail traveled in North America with his friends Philippe Andrieu, Jacques Boucharlat and Yves Kerbendeau, taking on the name Équipe Marquette ("Team Marquette"). They travel by canoe in the footsteps of Father Marquette, a Jesuit missionary who explored the Mississippi River in 1673. The voyage goes from Trois-Rivières in Quebec to New Orleans in Louisiana.

From the mouth of the Saint Lawrence River to that of the Mississippi, they pass by the Ottawa River and the Great Lakes. They travel through the area which used to be known as New France, which it is frequently referred to as throughout the book.

References

External links
 En canot sur les chemins d'eau du Roi at the publisher's website 
 En canot sur les chemins d'eau du Roi at the author's website 

2005 non-fiction books
Books about Quebec
Books about the United States
Canoeing mass media
French travel books
French-language books
Works by Jean Raspail